Ababacar Sadikh Soumaré (born 3 July 1994) is a Senegalese taekwondo practitioner.

At the 2018 African Taekwondo Championships held in Agadir, Morocco, he won the gold medal in the men's 80 kg event.

In 2019, he represented Senegal at the African Games held in Rabat, Morocco and he won one of the bronze medals in the men's 80 kg event.

References

External links 
 

Living people
1994 births
Place of birth missing (living people)
Senegalese male taekwondo practitioners
African Taekwondo Championships medalists
African Games medalists in taekwondo
African Games bronze medalists for Senegal
Competitors at the 2019 African Games
21st-century Senegalese people